Lebanese Olympic Committee (IOC code: LBN, 1964-2016: LIB) is the National Olympic Committee representing Lebanon.

In 1960 the Olympic Committee of Lebanon was awarded with the Count Alberto Bonacossa Trophy.

Presidents 
 Sheikh Gabriel Gemayel (1947-1988)
 Hussein Sejaan (1988-)
 Toni Khoury (1988-1996)
 Souhail Khoury (1996-2005; 2006-2008)
 Antoine Chartier (2010-2013)
 Jean Hammam (2013- )

See also 
Lebanon at the Olympics

References

External links 
Lebanese Olympic Committee

Lebanon
Oly
Lebanon at the Olympics
1947 establishments in Lebanon